Alexander Wallace (1872–1950) was an English professional footballer who played in the Football League for Ardwick and Small Heath. He played as an outside left.

Career
Wallace was born in Darwen, Lancashire. He played for Blackpool before making his Football League debut for Ardwick in the 1893–94 season. In 1894 he, together with teammates Mitchell Calvey, Archibald Ferguson and Tommy Little, left Ardwick, by then renamed Manchester City, to play for Baltimore Orioles F.C. in the newly formed American League of Professional Football. Most of the teams in the league, formed by owners of the National Baseball League in competition with the American Football Association, featured coaches, if not players, from their associated baseball team. Baltimore Orioles brought in a soccer coach, whose team of imported professionals won their opening games comprehensively, thus upsetting the other owners. The U.S. government threatened to investigate the use of foreign professionals, and in face of this threat and the owners' reluctance to subsidise poorly attended matches, the league soon folded.

On the players' return to England, Little was forgiven by his former employers and restored to Manchester City's team. Wallace, on the other hand, was unable to find another footballing employment until he signed for Small Heath in 1897. He played only twice in the league for Small Heath: his "three years of inactivity showed", and after a few months he dropped into non-league football with Hereford Thistle.

Wallace died in Bolton, Lancashire, in 1950, aged about 78.

References

1872 births
1950 deaths
People from Darwen
English footballers
Association football outside forwards
Blackpool F.C. players
Manchester City F.C. players
Baltimore Orioles F.C. players
Birmingham City F.C. players
Hereford Thistle F.C. players
English Football League players
Date of birth missing
Date of death missing
English expatriate sportspeople in the United States
Expatriate soccer players in the United States
English expatriate footballers